Dušan Bogdanović (born 1955) is a Serbian-born American composer and classical guitarist. He has explored musical languages which are reflected in his style today: a synthesis of classical, jazz, and ethnic music. As a soloist and in collaboration with other artists, he has toured extensively throughout Europe, Japan, and the U.S. He has taught at the University of Southern California, San Francisco Conservatory, and the Geneva University of Music.

His performing and recording activities include work with chamber ensembles of diverse stylistic orientations: the Falla Guitar Trio; a harpsichord and guitar duo with Elaine Comparone; and jazz collaborations with Anthony Cox, Charlie Haden, James Newton, Milcho Leviev, Arto Tunçboyacıyan, and others. Notably, he is a co-author with Sting on "Prisms (Six Song by Sting)" published by Singidunum Music and Steerpike Overseas Limited.

Dušan Bogdanović's recording credits include close to twenty albums (on Intuition, Doberman, Ess.a.y, M.A. Recordings, GSP and other labels), ranging from Bach Trio Sonatas to contemporary works. Over two hundred of his compositions are published by Bèrben Editions (Italy), Doberman-Yppan (Canada) and Guitar Solo publications (San Francisco).

His theoretical work includes polyrhythmic and polymetric studies, as well as a bilingual publication covering three-voice counterpoint and Renaissance improvisation for guitar (Bèrben) and Ex Ovo. (Doberman-Yppan). He has also collaborated on multi-disciplinary projects involving music, psychology, philosophy, and fine arts.

Partial discography
 Worlds, M.A (1989)
 Keys to Talk By, M.A (1992)
 Bach with Pluck! ESS.A.Y  (1992)
 Levantine Tales, M.A (1992)
 Bach with Pluck! Vol. 2, ESS.A.Y (1994)
 In the Midst of Winds, (1994)
 Mysterious Habitats, Guitar Solo Publications, (1995)
 Unconscious in Brazil, Guitar Solo Publications (1999)
 Yano Mori, Intuition (1999)
 Canticles, Editions Doberman (2001)
 Early to Rise, (Palo Alto, 2003)
 And Yet..., Editions Doberman (2005)
 Winter Tale, Editions Doberman (2008)
 Look at the Big Birds, Carmen Alvarez, Francisco Bernier, Contrastes (2014)
 En la tierra, Editions Doberman (2015)
 Bogdanovic: Guitar Music, Angelo Marchese, Brilliant Classics (2015)

Partial list of works

Solo guitar
 Sonata no.1 (1978), Berben 2445
 Cinq Miniatures Printanieres (1979), Berben 2308
 Jazz Sonata (1982), Guitar Solo Publications 44
 Introduction, Passacaglia and Fugue for the Golden Flower (1985), Berben 3015
 Sonata no.2, (1985), Berben 2581
 Polyrhythmic and Polymetric Studies, (1990), Berben 3320
 Raguette no.2, (1991), Berben 3601
 Six Balkan Miniatures (1991), Guitar Solo Publications 79
 Mysterious Habitats (1994), Guitar Solo Publications 131
 In Winter Garden (1996), Guitar Solo Publications 163
 Three African Sketches (1996), Guitar Solo Publications 195
 Book of the Unknown Standards (1997), Doberman 267
 Three Ricercars (1998), Doberman 258
 Triptico en Omenaje a Garcia Lorca (2002), Doberman 532
 Hymn to the Muse (2003), Doberman 525
 Fantasia (hommage a Maurice Ohana) (2009), Doberman 697

Chamber music with guitar
 Sonata Fantasia, 2 guitars (1990–91), Berben 3501
 No Feathers on This Frog, 2 guitars (1990), Doberman 300
 Canticles, 2 guitars (1998), Doberman 281
 Tres Nubes, 2 guitars (2004), Doberman 488
 Tombeau de Purcell, 2 guitars (2004), Doberman 504
 Trio, 3 prepared guitars (1989), Doberman 675
 Pastorale, 3 guitars (1991), Guitar Solo Publications 190
 Lyric Quartet, 4 guitars (1993), Berben 3669
 Introduction and Dance, 4 guitars (1995), Doberman 278
 Codex XV, 4 guitars or guitar ensemble (1998), Doberman 263
 The Snow Queen (A Musical Fairy Tale after H. C. Andersen), guitar ensemble (7) and narrator (2008), Doberman 669
 Pure Land, voice, flute and guitar (poetry by Patricia Capetola) (1981) Doberman 681
 Crow, voice, flute, guitar and bass (poetry by Ted Hughes) (1990), Doberman 269
 Five Songs on poetry by Gabriela Mistral, voice and guitar (1991), Doberman 318
 Metamorphoses, harp and guitar (1993), Berben 3777
 Like a String of Jade Jewels (Six Native American Songs), voice and guitar (1994), Doberman 306
 Do the Dead Know What Time it is? (poetry by Kenneth Patchen), voice and guitar (1996), Doberman 296
 And Yet..., flute, koto and guitar (flute and 2 guitars) (1997), Doberman 236
 Sevdalinka, 2 guitars and string quartet (1999), Doberman 406
 Byzantine Theme and Variations, guitar and string quartet (2002), Doberman 453
 Games, (poetry by Vasko Popa), voice, flute, guitar, bass and percussion (2) (2002), Doberman 465

Guitar and orchestra
 Concerto, guitar and string orchestra (1979), Doberman 400
 Prayers, 2 guitars and string orchestra (2005), Doberman 570
 Kaleidoscope, concerto for guitar and chamber ensemble (2008), Doberman 659
 No Feathers on This Frog, 2 guitars and symphonic orchestra (1990), Doberman 694
 Silence for guitar and orchestra (2015), Doberman 991

Miscellaneous
 A Journey Home, with Georgia Kelly, (1989) Global Pacific ON 54152
 Six Illuminations, piano (1994), Berben 3778
 Cantilena and Fantasia, piano (1995), Doberman 357
 Do the Dead Know What Time it is? (poetry by Kenneth Patchen), voice, flute, cello and piano (1996), Singidunum Music
 Balkan Mosaic, oboe, flute, violin, cello, keyboards and percussion (2000), Doberman 364
 Three Obfuscations, piano (2001), Doberman 397
 To Where Does the One Return?, 7 non- specified percussion instruments,(2001), Doberman 296
 Over the Face of the Water, piano 4 hands (2003), Singidunum Music
 Codex XV, string orchestra (2004), Doberman 486

Critical and scholarly studies
 Kishimine, Hiroshi. A Close Look Into the Diverse World of Dusan Bogdanovic; discovering influences through analyses of selected solo guitar works. DMA diss., Shenandoah Conservatory, Virginia, 2007.
 Yen, Ruey Shyang, Exoticism in Modern Guitar Music: works of Carlo Domeniconi; Ravi Shankar; Benjamin Britten; Dusan Bogdanovic. DMA diss. Arizona State University, 1996.
 Curry, Jane, Balkan ecumene and synthesis in selected compositions for classical guitar by Bogdanovic, Mamangakis and Ian Krouse D.M.A. diss.Arizona State University 2010, 89 pages ; AAT 3434345
 Hong Chu Tee, Modern Classical Guitar its use of Scordatura: a Historical Background and its Exploration from the Late Twentieth Century to the Present, A Dissertation submitted in partial fulfilment of the requirements of University of Glamorgan for the degree of MMus, 2012, pages 50–56
 Morey II, Michael J., A Pedagogical and Analytical Study of Dušan Bogdanović’s Polyrhythmic and Polymetric Studies for Guitar, diss. D.M.A., University of North Texas,2011
 García Álvarez, Ma. Carmen. "Dusan Bogdanovic (Serbia 1955 -) Eclecticismo musical en su obra para guitarra". Andalucía educa, no. 109. (Julio 2013) p. 8-9. 
 Samuele Benvenuti," Jazz Sonata di Dusan Bogdanovic contestualizzazione e spunti analitici,"Università degli studi di Pavia, Laurea in musicologia, 2013-2014
 Clarysse Silke, Dušan Bogdanović, een componist in dialoog met de wereld ; Etnologische invloeden op "Six Balkan Miniatures", "3 African Sketches" en op het oeuvre van Dušan Bogdanović in het algemeen.  D. M. A., Leuven University College of Arts, 2014
Counterpoint for Guitar, (Bèrben, 1996)

References

Further reading
Bogdanovic, Dusan, "Verso une nuova sintesi" - article with biographical ref., GuitArt November/December 1996; pp. 31–37. 
Attademo, Luigi, "La mia ricerca, tra composizione e innovazione" - Dusan Bogdanovic interview, GuitArt 1999, No. XV, pp. 4–9.
Martinez, Emma, Dusan Bogdanovic interview, Classical Guitar Magazine, UK, 1998, pp. 11–20.

External links
Official Homepage
Les Éditions Doberman-Yppan
Haute école de musique de Genève
Multimod Performer-Composer Festival
Bogdanovic YouTube   Channel

American male composers
20th-century American composers
American classical guitarists
American male guitarists
American people of Serbian descent
Musicians from Belgrade
Serbian classical guitarists
Serbian composers
Yugoslav emigrants to the United States
1955 births
Living people
University of Southern California faculty
San Francisco Conservatory of Music faculty
Winners of the Geneva International Music Competition
20th-century American guitarists
Guitarists from California
Classical musicians from California
20th-century American male musicians